Manthani is a municipal town in Manthani mandal in Peddapalli district of the Indian state of Telangana. It is located in Manthani mandal. It is situated on the banks of the river Godavari.

Geography 

Manthani is surrounded by the sacred Godavari river. Manthani assembly constituency is the largest constituency in Telangana in terms of area.
The Current MLA of Manthani is Sridhar Babu , from the Indian National Congress.This is his fourth term as the MLA of Manthani

See also 
Manthani (Assembly constituency)
Sridhar Babu

History 
According to an inscription of Sri Jagadguru Shankaracharya at Dwarakapeetam and Pushpagiri Peetam, Adi Shankara had visited Manthani. A ruined Shiva temple, once-prominent dating back to the period of Kakatiya Dynasty, known as Gautameshwara, is found in Manthani.  It is known for elaborate carvings and fine sculptures similar to that of main Kakatiya temples such as the Thousand Pillar Temple in Warangal.

References

http://lsi.gov.in:8081/jspui/bitstream/123456789/2827/1/27473_1971_MAN.pdf

Mandal headquarters in Karimnagar district
Cities and towns in Peddapalli district